Ysbyty Cwm Rhondda (English: Rhondda Valley Hospital) is a health facility on Partridge Road, Llwynypia, Rhondda Cynon Taf, Wales. It is managed by the Cwm Taf Morgannwg University Health Board.

History
The facility was commissioned to replace the aging Llwynypia Hospital in the town. The new facility, which was designed by Nightingale Associates and built by Cowlins on the site of a former coal mine at a cost of £36 million, opened in January 2010.

References

Hospitals in Rhondda Cynon Taf
Hospitals established in 2010
2010 establishments in Wales
Hospital buildings completed in 2010
Buildings and structures in Rhondda Cynon Taf
NHS hospitals in Wales
Cwm Taf Morgannwg University Health Board